Dong Ba Thin Base Camp (also known as Dong Ba Thin Airfield and Dong Ba Thin Special Forces Camp) is a former U.S. Army base located northwest of Cam Ranh Base in Khánh Hòa Province, southern Vietnam.

History
Dong Ba Thin Base Camp was established on Highway 1 at Dong Ba Thin, 4 km northwest of Cam Ranh Base and 22 km south of Nha Trang in 1964.

The base comprised several different adjacent facilities: Dong Ba Thin Airfield, a short asphalt runway army airfield; Dong Ba Thin Heliport (also known as Flanders Army Heliport) on the west side of the airfield and the Special Forces Camp.

The Special Forces Camp was first established by Detachment B-1, 5th Special Forces Group in December 1964 and was later used by Detachments 37, B-51, A-132, A-411 and A-521. In addition, the facility was a Special Forces forward operating base and used for Military Assistance Command, Vietnam – Studies and Observations Group operations.

From November 1970 to February 1973 the base was used by the United States Army Vietnam UITG individual training group battalion, responsible for the training of Khmer National Armed Forces (FANK) infantry battalions in weapons use, tactics and first aid.

In March 1972 the 18-man 2nd New Zealand Army Training Team Vietnam (2 NZATTV), which included members from different branches of service including two Royal New Zealand Navy (RNZN) personnel, was deployed to the camp to assist with the training of FANK personnel, they would remain there until December 1972.

With the withdrawal of US and New Zealand forces from South Vietnam in 1972-3, the training mission was taken over by the Army of the Republic of Vietnam.

Current use
The base remains in use by the People's Army of Vietnam as Lữ Đoàn HQĐB 101.

See also 
 Army of the Republic of Vietnam Special Forces
 Cambodian Civil War
 Khmer National Armed Forces
 Khmer Serei
 United States Special Forces
 Vietnam War

References

Installations of the United States Army in South Vietnam
Installations of the Army of the Republic of Vietnam
Buildings and structures in Khánh Hòa province